is a Japanese bank holding and financial services company headquartered in Chiyoda, Tokyo, Japan.

MUFG holds assets of around US$3.1 trillion as of 2016 and is one of the "Three Great Houses" of the Mitsubishi Group alongside Mitsubishi Corporation and Mitsubishi Heavy Industries. It is Japan's largest financial group and the world's second largest bank holding company holding around US$1.8 trillion (JP¥148 trillion) in deposits as of March 2011. The letters MUFG come from Mitsubishi and United Financial of Japan.

Background
The company was formed on October 1, 2005, with the merger of Tokyo-based Mitsubishi Tokyo Financial Group (MTFG), and Osaka-based UFJ Holdings.

The core banking units of the group, Bank of Tokyo-Mitsubishi and UFJ Bank, were merged on January 1, 2006, to form MUFG Bank. This integration was originally scheduled to take place on October 1, 2005, the same day that the parent companies were merged. However, pressure from Japan's Financial Services Agency, which wanted to ensure the smooth systems integration of the two banking giants, caused the merger of the banks to be postponed for three months. The trust banking and securities units of MTFG and UFJ were merged according to the original schedule on October 1, 2005.

On October 31, 2018, MUFG to acquire Australian Asset Manager, Colonial First State Global Asset Management.

Senior leadership 

 Chairman: Kanetsugu Mike (since April 2021)
 Chief Executive: Hironori Kamezawa (Since April 2021)

List of former chairmen 

 Ryosuke Tamakoshi (2005–2010)
 Takamune Okihara (2010–2014)
 Kiyoshi Sono (2014–2019)
 Nobuyuki Hirano (2019–2021)

List of former chief executives 

 Nobuo Kuroyanagi (2005–2010)
 Katsunori Nagayasu (2010–2013)
 Nobuyuki Hirano (2013–2019)
 Kanetsugu Mike (2019–2021)

History
The financial group dates back to 1880 as the Yokohama Specie Bank, later renamed to The Bank of Tokyo. Also in 1880, The Mitsubishi Bank, Ltd. was founded by former samurai Yataro Iwasaki. In 1919, the Mitsubishi Bank financed the Mitsubishi zaibatsu, most of which is today Mitsubishi Heavy Industries. After the Second World War the Mitsubishi Keiretsu was broken up under US imposed laws, and Mitsubishi Bank took on greater independence, albeit still central to the financing of the growth of the Mitsubishi group of companies.

In April 1996, The Mitsubishi Bank, Ltd. and The Bank of Tokyo, Ltd. merged.  The Bank of Tokyo had been set up by the Japanese Government to act as Japan's international bank, and solely responsible for all Yen forex trading. Uniquely in Japan, with no keiretsu, Bank of Tokyo was an ideal partner for Mitsubishi Bank, complementing the latter' strong domestic franchise with a unique international footprint.  Additionally, during Japan's lost decade of economic stagnation, this marriage of two relatively strong banks was seen as a positive step in cleaning up the country's moribund banking sector.

In July 2004, Japan's fourth-largest financial group UFJ Holdings offered to merge with the Mitsubishi Tokyo Financial Group. The merger of the two bank holding companies was completed on October 1, 2005. UFJ was created from a merger with the Toyo Trust and Banking. UFJ was accused by the government of corruption and making bad loans to the yakuza crime syndicates.

The takeover of UFJ by the Mitsubishi Tokyo Financial Group was challenged by the Sumitomo Mitsui Banking Group, another of Japan's large banking groups, which launched a competing takeover bid. The Mitsubishi Tokyo Financial Group ultimately prevailed in the fight to acquire UFJ. The battle between the two Japanese mega-banks seemed to signal an end to the clubby atmosphere that had prevailed in Japan's postwar banking industry.

The trust banking and securities units of the two groups were merged on October 1, 2005. The core banking units of MTFG and UFJ, The Bank of Tokyo-Mitsubishi, Ltd. and UFJ Bank, respectively, continued to operate separately until January 1, 2006, when they were merged to form MUFG Bank.

In September 2008, MUFG signed a letter of intent with Morgan Stanley to form an alliance and purchase 20% of the American firm.

In 2008 at the 2008 ALB Japan Law Awards, Mitsubishi UFJ was crowned:
 In-House of the Year – Japan Investment Bank In-House Team of the Year
 Deal of the Year – Debt Market Deal of the Year

In April 2011, MUFG and Morgan Stanley entered into an agreement to convert MUFG's outstanding convertible preferred stock in Morgan Stanley into Morgan Stanley stock.

Mitsubishi Tokyo Financial Group, Inc.

 was one of Japan's largest banks ranked by assets (an estimated US$1 trillion), second only to Mizuho Holdings. On October 1, 2005, MTFG completed the acquisition of UFJ Holdings, Japan's fourth largest banking group, to form the Mitsubishi UFJ Financial Group (MUFG), the world's largest bank ranked by assets with ¥190 trillion (approximately $1.7 trillion).

MTFG was widely considered financially the strongest of Japan's large banks, with non-performing loans down to 2.9% of assets.

UFJ Holdings, Inc.
UFJ Holdings, Inc. (株式会社UFJホールディングス; kabushikigaisha UFJ hōrudingusu) was the weakest among the three major banking groups in Japan. UFJ, an abbreviation of United Financial of Japan, was formed from a merger of Sanwa Bank and Tokai Bank with the Toyo Trust & Banking Co. Ltd, a part of the Toyota Motor Corporation. At the time, it was one of the largest shareholders of Toyota. The Chairman of Toyota was a director on its board during the financial scandals and indictments of three UFJ executives. The banking crisis led to its merger, after being one of the world's greatest losing corporations, on October 1, 2005, with the Mitsubishi Tokyo Financial Group to form the Mitsubishi UFJ Financial Group.

Formed April 1, 2001, with the merger of Sanwa Bank, Tokai Bank, and Toyo Trust and Banking.

In July 2004, UFJ announced plans to merge with the Mitsubishi Tokyo Financial Group.  The merger was completed on October 1, 2005, creating the Mitsubishi UFJ Financial Group, the world's second biggest bank by assets at $1.7 trillion, trailing behind Citigroup with $2.4 trillion in assets.

In June 2011, MUFG took a 9.99 percent stake in Lynas Corp, an Australian rare earths developer.

Group companies

Commercial bank
 MUFG Bank, Ltd.
 Bank of Ayudhya, bank in Thailand 
 Security Bank, semi-major bank in the Philippines.
 Vietinbank, Vietnamese bank.
 Bank Danamon, bank in Indonesia. 
 , online.

Associated companies
Trust bank
Mitsubishi UFJ Trust and Banking Corporation
Microfinance
Hattha Kaksekar (Cambodia microfinance institution)
 Securities
 (intermediate holding company)
Mitsubishi UFJ Securities (a retail joint venture between with Morgan Stanley)
  (a joint venture between MUFG and Morgan Stanley)
  (private banking brokerage business entities)
  (Internet-only securities)

 Lease
 
 
 
 Research and consulting

 Mitsubishi Asset Brains
 Mitsubishi UFJ Trust Investment Engineering Laboratory
 System
Mitsubishi Research Institute DCS 
 
 
 
 MU Business Engineering
 Asset management
 The Master Trust Bank of Japan
 Asset Management

 MU Investment Advisor
 MUFG Investor Services
 Venture capital
 Mitsubishi UFJ Capital
 Wealth management
 Mitsubishi UFJ Wealth Management Securities
 Mitsubishi UFJ Personal Financial Advisors
 Factoring
 Mitsubishi UFJ Factor
 Securities agency
 Japan share holder service
 Banking agency
 Mitsubishi UFJ Financial Partners
 Foreign currency exchange

 Consumer finance
 Acom (equity-method affiliate)
 Cards and credit sales
Mitsubishi UFJ NICOS
 
  (affiliated company accounted for by the equity method)
 
  
 Finance
  (unlimited company)
 Real estate

 Debt collection
 
 Public interest corporation
 Foundation Mitsubishi UFJ Trust Scholarship Foundation
 Mitsubishi UFJ Trust and Regional Culture Foundation
 Mitsubishi UFJ Trust Arts Foundation
 Mitsubishi UFJ International Foundation
 Mitsubishi Economic Research Institute
 Mitsubishi Foundation
 Mitsubishi Yowa

Investment holdings
  (39.9%)
 The Master Trust Bank of Japan, Ltd. (46.5%)
 Morgan Stanley (22.4%) 
 Chong Hing Bank (9.66%) 
 Union Bank N.A. (100%) 
 Vietinbank (20%), with which the Group decided to establish a strategic partnership in December 2012

Major shareholders
As of March 31, 2013:

See also

 Loans in Japan

References

External links
 Mitsubishi UFJ Financial Group website—
 Mitsubishi UFJ Financial Group website—

 
Mitsubishi companies
Conglomerate companies of Japan
Banks of Japan
Conglomerate companies based in Tokyo
Financial services companies based in Tokyo
Holding companies based in Tokyo
Multinational companies headquartered in Japan
Chiyoda, Tokyo
Japanese companies established in 2005
Banks established in 2005
Holding companies established in 2005
Companies listed on the Tokyo Stock Exchange
Companies listed on the New York Stock Exchange